is a Japanese electrical engineer and professor at Tokyo Institute of Technology (since January 2000), IEEE Fellow.

He received his B.S. degree from Nagoya Institute of Technology in 1974, and his M.S. and Ph. D. degrees from Tokyo Institute of Technology in 1976 and 1979, in all electrical engineering.

Recognition
2018: IEEE Power Medal Award
2008: IEEE Richard Harold Kaufmann Award 
Four IEEE Transactions Prize Paper Awards
2004: IEEE Industry Applications Society Outstanding Achievement Award
2001: IEEE William E. Newell Power Electronics Award
1996: IEEE Fellowship

References

1952 births
Living people
Tokyo Institute of Technology alumni
Academic staff of Tokyo Institute of Technology
Japanese electrical engineers
IEEE award recipients
Fellow Members of the IEEE